The Comecrudo people were an Indigenous people of Mexico, who lived in the northern state of Tamaulipas. They were a Coahuiltecan people.

Territory 
The Comecrudo lived in northern Tamaulipas in the 17th and 18th centuries. In the late 18th century, they lived on the southern bank of the Rio Grande, not far from Reynosa.

Language 
They spoke the Comecrudo language, one of the Pakawan languages. E Swiss-American ethnologist Albert S. Gatschet worked with eight Comecrudo elders who remembered some of the language to record vocabulary words in 1886.

Name 
The name Comecrudo means "raw meat eaters" in Spanish. Spanish colonists also called them the Carrizo, meaning "reed." In 1886, they told Gaschet they preferred the name Comecrudo over Carrizo. The Tonkawa and Kiowa called them the "shoeless people."

History 
In 1886, about 30 to 35 Comecrudo lived near Charco Escondido in Tamaulipas. Their last elected chief, Marcelino, died in 1856.

The Kiowa took some Comecrudo captive.

Heritage group 
An organization in Floresville, Texas, claims descent from the Comecrudo and formed the Carrizo Comecrudo Nation of Texas Inc. As an unrecognized organization, they are neither a federally recognized tribe nor a state-recognized tribe.

References 

Ethnic groups in Mexico
Indigenous peoples of Aridoamerica
Indigenous peoples in Mexico
Native American tribes in Texas